Talbot is an unincorporated community in Menominee County, in the U.S. state of Michigan.

History
A post office was established at Talbot in 1883, and remained in operation until it was discontinued in 1905. The community was named for Matthew Talbot, 30th Governor of Georgia.

References

Unincorporated communities in Menominee County, Michigan